Ǵavato is a village in the municipality of Bogdanci, North Macedonia at the border with Greece.

Demographics
According to the 2002 census, the village had a total of 438 inhabitants. Ethnic groups in the village include:

Macedonians 407
Serbs 21
Turks 4
Other 4

References

Villages in Bogdanci Municipality